This is a list of foreign players in Elitserien, which commenced play in 2007–08. The following players must meet both of the following two criteria:
have played at least one Elitserien game. Players who were signed by Elitserien clubs, but only played in lower league, cup and/or European games, or did not play in any competitive games at all, are not included.
are considered foreign, determined by the following:
A player is considered foreign if he is not eligible to play for Sweden national bandy team.

Players from the former Soviet Union were able to play in Sweden after the union ceased to exist.

List of players

Finland

Ville Aaltonen – Bollnäs – 2008–18
Mikko Aarni – Sandviken – 2007–14
Samuli Helavuori – Bollnäs – 2011–18
Kimmo Kyllönen – Sirius, IFK Kungälv, Tellus, IFK Vänersborg – 2013–18
Juho Liukkonen – Bollnäs, IFK Vänersborg – 2009–14, 2017–18
Mikko Lukkarila – Bollnäs, IFK Kungälv, IFK Vänersborg – 2008–18
Tommi Määttä – Edsbyn – 2016–18
Tuomas Määttä – Edsbyn – 2016–18

Kazakhstan
Aleksandr Dryagin – Sandviken – 2007–08, 2009–10
Sergey Pochkunov – Frillesås BK – 2019–2022

Norway
Felix Callander – IFK Vänersborg – 2017–18
Nikolai Rustad Jensen – Villa Lidköping – 2017–18
Markus Fremstad – Frillesås BK – 2021–2022

Russia

Pavel Bulatov – IFK Vänersborg – 2016–17
Alan Dzhusoev – Hammarby – 2017–18
Ilya Grachev – Sirius, Hammarby – 2012–2014, 2017–18
Nikita Ivanov – IFK Vänersborg – 2016–17
Ivan Lebedev – Tillberga, Hammarby – 2015–18
Sergey Lomanov – IFK Vänersborg – 2016–17
Ruslan Shuvalov – Hammarby – 2007–08

See also
List of Elitserien players
List of foreign Russian Bandy Super League players

Notes

References

Elitserien
foreign